Events in the year 1687 in India.

Events
National income - ₹7,004 million
Founding of Calcutta by Job Charnock, an East India merchant.
Conquest of the Deccan by Emperor Aurungzebe; Hyderabad becomes the residence of the governor of the Deccan.

References

 
India
Years of the 17th century in India